Below is a list of computer museums around the world, organized by continent and country, then alphabetically by location.

Asia

Japan
IPSJ Computer Museum - A virtual museum by IPSJ, an academic society of information processing in Japan
KCG Computer Museum, Kyoto - a computer museum by KCG, an education institution
Tokyo University of Science Museum of Science's "History of the Computer"

South Korea
 Nexon Computer Museum

Australia
The Australian Computer Museum Society, Inc, NSW - very large collection
The Nostalgia Box, Perth - Video Game Museum
Powerhouse Museum - Has Computer Exhibit
Monash Museum of Computing History, Monash University

Europe

Belgium
 Computermuseum NAM-IP, Namur
 Unisys Computermuseum, Haren (Brussels)

Croatia
Peek&Poke, Rijeka

Czech Republic
Apple Museum, Prague

Denmark 

 Dansk Datahistorisk Forening, Hedehusene

Finland
Rupriikki Media Museum, Tampere
Finnish Museum of Games, Tampere

France
ACONIT, Grenoble
, Paris
FEB, Angers
Musée des Arts et Métiers, Paris
Musée de l’imprimerie, Lyon
AMISA : Association pour un Musée de l’informatique, Sophia Antipolis 
INRIA : Institut national de recherche en Informatique et Automatique,  Montbonnot-Saint-Martin
Silicium, Toulouse

Germany
Computerspielemuseum Berlin, Berlin - Video Game Museum
BINARIUM, Dortmund - Video Game and Personal Computer Museum
Heinz Nixdorf MuseumsForum, Paderborn
Computermuseum der Fakultät Informatik, University of Stuttgart
Oldenburger Computer-Museum, Oldenburg
Computeum, Vilshofen, with a selection from the Munich Computer Warehouse, Private Collection
Deutsches Museum, Munich - Large computer collection in their Communications exhibit
technikum29 living museum, Frankfurt - Re-opened in January 2020.
Computerarchiv Muenchen, Munich - Computer, Video Games and Magazine Archive
Computermuseum der Fachhochschule Kiel, Kiel
:de:Analog Computer Museum, Bad Schwalbach / Hettenhain - Large collection of analog computers, working and under restoration.

Greece
 Hellenic IT Museum

Ireland
 Computer and Communications Museum of Ireland, National University of Ireland

Israel
The Israeli Personal Computer Museum, Haifa

Italy
Museo dell'Informatica Funzionante, Palazzolo Acreide (Siracusa)
Museo del Computer, via per Occhieppo, 29, 13891 Camburzano (Biella)
Museo Interattivo di Archeologia Informatica, Cosenza
UNESCO Computer Museum, Padova
All About Apple Museum, Savona
Piedmontese Museum of Informatics, Turin
VIGAMUS, Rome - Video Game Museum
Tecnologic@mente, Ivrea
Museo degli strumenti per il calcolo, Pisa

The Netherlands
 Bonami SpelComputer Museum, Zwolle
 Computer Museum Universiteit van Amsterdam, Amsterdam
 Computermuseum Hack42, Arnhem
 HomeComputerMuseum, Helmond 
 Rotterdams Radio Museum, Rotterdam

Poland
Muzeum Historii Komputerów i Informatyki, Katowice
Muzeum Gry i Komputery Minionej Ery (Muzeum Gier), Wrocław
Apple Muzeum Polska, Piaseczno

Portugal 

LOAD ZX Spectrum Museum, Cantanhede
Museu Faraday, IST - Instituto Superior Técnico, Lisboa
Nostalgica - Museu de Videojogos e tecnologia, Lisboa
Museu dos Computadores Inforap, Braga
Museu Virtual da Informática, Universidade do Minho, Braga
Museu das Comunicações, Lisboa
 Museu Nacional de História Natural e da Ciência - Universidade de Lisboa, Lisboa

Russia
Museum of Soviet Arcade Machines, Moscow
Yandex Museum, Moscow]
Yandex Museum, Saint-Petersburg
 Moscow Apple Museum
Antimuseum of Computers and Games, Yekaterinburg

Slovenia
 Computer Museum Društvo Računalniški Muzej, Ljubljana

Slovakia
Computer Museum SAV, Bratislava

Spain
Computer Museum Garcia Santesmases (MIGS), Complutense University
Museum of Informatics, Polytechnic University of Valencia
Museo de la Historia de la Computacion, Cáceres

Switzerland
Musée Bolo, Lausanne
Enter Museum, Solothurn

Ukraine
Software & Computer Museum, Kyiv, Kharkiv

United Kingdom
Northwest Computer Museum, Leigh, Wigan
The National Museum of Computing, Bletchley Park
The Centre for Computing History, Cambridge 
Retro Computer Museum, Leicester
Science Museum, London, London
National Archive for the History of Computing, University of Manchester
National Videogame Arcade, Nottingham
The Computing Futures Museum, Staffordshire University - In association with the BCS
Museum of Computing, Swindon
Time Line Computer Archive, Wigton
The Micro Museum, Ramsgate
Home Computer Museum, Hull
IBM Hursley Museum, Hursley
Derby Computer Museum
The ICL Computer Museum

See also: Computer Conservation Society

North America

Canada
EMusée, Montreal
Personal Computer Museum, Brantford
iMusée, Montreal
York University Computer Museum or YUCoM, York University
University of Saskatchewan Computer Museum

United States

Arizona
Southwest Museum of Engineering, Communications and Computation, Glendale, Arizona

California
Computer History Museum, Mountain View, California 
DigiBarn Computer Museum, Boulder Creek, California 
Museum of Art and Digital Entertainment, Oakland, California 
The Tech Museum of Innovation, San Jose, California 
Intel Museum, Santa Clara, California

D.C.
Smithsonian National Museum of American History, Washington, D.C.

Georgia
Computer Museum of America, Roswell, Georgia
Museum of Technology at Middle Georgia State University, Macon, Georgia

Kansas
The Topeka Computing Museum, Topeka, Kansas - Now being liquidated, online archive only.

Maryland
System Source Computer Museum, Hunt Valley, Maryland

Minnesota
Charles Babbage Institute, University of Minnesota

Montana
American Computer & Robotics Museum, Bozeman, Montana

New Jersey
Vintage Computer Federation Museum, Wall, New Jersey

New York
The Strong, International Center for the History of Electronic Games, Rochester, NY - Focus on Retrogaming but many games are on vintage personal computers.

Pennsylvania
Kennett Classic Computer Museum, Kennett Square, Pennsylvania
Large Scale Systems Museum, Pittsburgh, Pennsylvania
Pennsylvania Computer Museum, Parkesburg, Pennsylvania

Rhode Island
Rhode Island Computer Museum, North Kingstown, Rhode Island

Texas
Brazos Valley Computer Museum, Bryan, Texas
Museum of Computer Culture, Austin, Texas
National Videogame Museum, Frisco, Texas

Virginia
U.Va. Computer Museum, University of Virginia
Virginia Computer Museum

Washington
Living Computers: Museum + Labs, Seattle, Washington
Microsoft Visitor Center, Redmond, Washington

South America

Argentina
Espacio TEC, Bahia Blanca
Museo de Informática UNPA-UARG, Río Gallegos 
Museo de Informática de la República Argentina - Fundación ICATEC (closed), Ciudad Autónoma de Buenos Aires

Brasil
Museu Capixaba do Computador, Vitória/ES
Museu do Computador, São Paulo/SP

Online
The ICL Computer Museum (UK)
MV Museu de Tecnologia (Brazil) 
Old Computer Museum 
San Diego Computer Museum - Physical objects were donated to the San Diego State University Library, but still does online exhibits
Obsolete Computer Museum
Old-Computers.com
HP Computer Museum 
Early Office Museum 
IBM Archives 
EveryMac.com 
Bitsavers.org - Software and Document Archive
TAM (The Apple Museum) - Apple Computers and Products 
Rewind Museum - Virtual museum with traveling physical exhibits
The Computer Collector 
New Computer Museum 
IPSJ Computer Museum - Computers of Japan
Freeman PC Museum
FEMICOM Museum - Femininity in 20th century Video games, computers and electronic toys
Home Computer Museum 
Malware Museum - Malware programs from the 80's and 90's that have been stripped of their destructive properties.
History Computers 
KASS Computer Museum - A computer history museum & private collection
Russian Virtual Computer Museum - a history of Soviet Computers from the late 1940s
Soviet Digital Electronics Museum - a museum of Soviet electronic calculators, PCs and some other devices
Development of Computer Science and Technologies in Ukraine - Ukrainian virtual Computer Museum
Spectrum Generation collection, supporting the LOAD ZX Spectrum Museum in Portugal
Home Computer Museum UK

See also
 Computer museum
 List of video game museums

References 

History of computing
Lists of museums by subject

Video game museums